Velda Otsus (24 August 1913 Tartu – 16 August 2006 Tallinn) was an Estonian ballet dancer and stage actress.

In 1932 she graduated from Tartu Girls' Gymnasium. During the studies she studied dancing in Tiina Kapper's private studio. From 1932 until 1950, she was the principal ballerina at the Vanemuine, and from 1950 until 1961, an actress at the Vanemuine. From 1961 until 1982, she was an actress at the Estonian Drama Theatre.

Awards:
 1955: Meritorious Artist of the Estonian SSR
 1988: Best Actress of the Year
 1993 Estonian National Culture Foundation Lifetime Achievement Award
 1999: Order of the White Star, IV class.

Roles

 Aminta (Benatzky's "Kolm musketäri", 1932 and 1945)
 Barbara (Karma's "Lembitu", 1933)
 Azuri (Romberg's "Kõrbelaul", 1934)

References

1913 births
2006 deaths
Estonian ballet dancers
Estonian female dancers
Estonian stage actresses
20th-century Estonian actresses
Recipients of the Order of the White Star, 4th Class
Actresses from Tartu
People from Tartu
Burials at Rahumäe Cemetery
Soviet ballet dancers
Soviet actresses